The ICL DRS was a range of departmental computers from International Computers Limited (ICL). Standing originally for Distributed Resource System, the full name was later dropped in favour of the abbreviation.

During the mid-1980s separate Office Systems business units had produced a disparate range of products including IBM-compatible PCs such as the PWS (a PC/AT clone), small servers branded DRS, and various larger Unix servers sold under the Clan range. A rebranding in late 1988 pulled these together under the DRS brand, with a consistent mid-grey and peppermint-green livery.

The ICL division responsible for these systems eventually became part of the Fujitsu-Siemens joint venture.

DRS 20/100/200 

The original DRS was the DRS 20 produced in Utica, New York and launched in September 1981. This ran the proprietary DRX (Distributed Resource Executive) operating system. The basic 'intelligent terminal' (model 10/110/210) used 8-bit 8085 processors (workstation, application and network processors), each with between 32 KB and 128 KB of memory. The Model 210 also had an 80188 application processor with 512 KB to run CP/M. The larger models 20 and 40 had floppy disk drives. The floor-standing models 50, 150, and 250 had hard disks, from which diskless models booted. In early models, these were 8" floppy disks, and later 5¼" disks.

The diskless model, that partnered the DRS 20, was the DRS 10. It had 10 KB available for applications programs developed in CIS COBOL.

Up to 16 DRS 20/DRS 10 machines could be connected via LAN with the addresses being set by DIP switches on the rear of the unit. The LAN was formed via 93 ohm coaxial cable in a bus formation running at 1.25 Mbps.

The final model 310 (styled like a DRS 300 module) had a second 80186 application processor with 1 MB RAM to run Concurrent DOS, emulating an IBM PC with a Hercules screen display.

DRS 300 
In the mid-1980s ICL developed the DRS 300 in Kidsgrove, and ran down Utica. Launched in 1986, DRS 300 was a modular system consisting of A4-sized units designed to be placed on an office bookshelf. Modules containing a power supply (Kx), processor (Ax), hard and floppy disks (Dx), streamer tape (Sx) etc. were connected by SCSI. Initial models used a 6 MHz 80286 processor (A1 module) with up to 1 MB memory. Later modules used an 8 MHz processor (A2) or 80286 with 80287 maths coprocessor (A3) with up to 4 MB, and ran Concurrent CP/M-86 and later Concurrent DOS. Although this could run code developed under CP/M, PC DOS or MS-DOS, in practice available applications were limited because many shrink-wrapped packages developed for the IBM PC made use of direct access to the (IBM) hardware. This was addressed through use of softclone technology to intercept such calls. However, this required the continual release of patches for new application versions.

The initial DRS 300 also ran ICL's implementation of Unix System V Release 2, DRS/NX V2, though that was never released commercially. Later an 80386 (A4) module was added, to run a 32-bit DRS/NX V3, based on System V Release 3.

DRS 400, DRS 500 
These brand names were applied to bought-in Unix boxes. The DRS 400 originated as the Clan 4, based on the Motorola 68020 running UniSoft's Uniplus Unix. This was later replaced by the DRS 400E, based on the Motorola 68030 running DRS/NX V3.
DRS 500 originated as the Clan 5, 6 and 7 based on the CCI Power 6/32. This was built in Irvine by CCI, which had been taken over by ICL's parent STC PLC. CCI was also the source of what became ICL's flagship OfficePower office application suite across the DRS range.

DRS 3000 
The successor to DRS 300, the DRS 3000 was an IBM-compatible, 80486-based, floor-standing model running SVR4. The P5 Pentium-based Level 656 was launched in September 1993.

DRS 6000 
The in-house (Irvine/Bracknell) developed DRS 6000 was launched in January 1990 as a washing machine-sized SPARC-based server, running ICL's implementation of Unix System V Release 4 (SVR4). It also had a 68020-based Central Service Module board (CSM), leading to sarcastic comments in the press that it was a DRS 400 in disguise. By 1992 there were desktop, slimline and full sized models, ranging from a single-processor desktop model rated at 29 MIPS (L240) to a 4-processor model rated at 116 MIPS (L644). Some models were sold by Fujitsu as the DS/90. ICL received the Queen's Award for Export Achievement for DRS 6000 in 1993.

The DRS 6000 competed directly with IBM's RS/6000, which was launched a few weeks later; originally planned to be called the DRS 600 it was renamed when it was found that IBM had decided on the RS 6000.

In 1994, the DRS range was superseded by the SuperServer (Ks (SPARC) and Ki (Intel)) and TeamServer (Es (1-2 SPARC CPUs), Hs (2-4 SPARC CPUs), Ei (1 x86 CPU), Hi (2 x86 CPUs)) ranges of SPARC and Intel-based machines, running DRS/NX Unix or Microsoft Windows NT.
 DRS 6000 Level 200 Series
 DRS 6000 Level 600 Series

DRS PWS 
In 1987, the DRS Professional Work Station (PWS) was ICL's first foray into IBM PC/AT compatible computing. The DRS PWS was initially released with MS-DOS 4.0 (not to be confused with the later public releases of IBM DOS 4.0 in July 1988 and MS-DOS 4.01 in November 1988). This was a real-mode pre-emptive multitasking version of MS-DOS 2.0 and was also the forerunner of OS/2. It was soon replaced with MS-DOS 4.1 when this became available; this was written especially for the DRS PWS, but was not finished for the launch. Microsoft agreed to write a custom version of MS-DOS 4.0 for ICL that would take advantage of the extra memory on the ICL computers. As a consequence, PWS users had a number of software compatibility challenges, although the PC Business Unit (PCBU) at ICL BRA04, in Bracknell, did patch some applications for larger customers.

The PWS was positioned to compete with the IBM Personal System/2 (PS/2) and the DEC Vaxstation 2000. In 1988, the DRS PWS and DRS PWS 386 were respectively rebranded as the DRS Model 60 and DRS Model 80.

The PWS hardware was a large desktop or floor standing tower chassis, running on an Intel 8 MHz 80286 processor that was later superseded by an Intel 20 MHz 80386 (DRS PWS 386). Memory expansion was via proprietary cards (1 MB or 4 MB cards, 16 MB total) and initially there was no support for 1.44 MB High Density (HD) floppy drives, although a hardware modification to the clock lines on the floppy disk controller meant that later versions of the PWS could be upgraded. The ENGA (EGA compatible video) controller, displayed standard EGA graphics and text with an additional line reserved on the bottom row for multitasking and communications task messages.

The PWS was capable of communicating with ICL departmental and mainframe services using a combination of Microlan2 and OSLAN (Open Systems Local Area Network) protocols. Microsoft and OSLAN network connectivity was supported via BICC OSLAN cards (OSLAN being ICL's implementation of OSI transport protocols over Ethernet). TCP/IP and DECnet support was implemented by third parties using packet drivers, as NDIS was not available at this time.

Development software 

Languages on DRS 20 under DRX included Microsoft BASIC, Micro Focus CIS-COBOL, Pascal, 8085 Assembler, 
and application building packages including Userbuild and the Demon suite.

Languages on DRS 300 Concurrent DOS included Lattice C, CBASIC, Micro Focus Level II COBOL and
Digital Research languages including FORTRAN and Pascal.

Development software on the Unix-based DRS ranges (300 to 6000) included C, Micro Focus and RM COBOL, EPC C++, FORTRAN and Pascal, and relational databases including Ingres, Informix, Oracle, Sybase and Progress 4GL supplied by Progress Software.

During this period, ICL's software strategy was increasingly to make available on its own hardware popular software packages developed by third parties. Almost invariably this involved porting the source code, as there was insufficient compatibility between machines at the binary level. In order to reduce the cost of this activity, and the commercial disadvantage of not having as large a software portfolio as rival vendors, ICL invested strenuous efforts to improve cross-industry compatibility through initiatives such as X/Open.

Notes

External links
 The ICL Computer Museum

Computer-related introductions in 1981
DRS